Anthony Wingfield was an English MP for Suffolk and Horsham.

Anthony Wingfield may also refer to:

Anthony Wingfield (died 1605), Member of Parliament (MP) for Orford, Dunwich and Suffolk
Anthony Wingfield (MP for Ripon) ( 1550– 1615), MP for Ripon
Sir Anthony Wingfield, 1st Baronet (  1585–1638) of the Wingfield baronets
Sir Anthony Wingfield (1857–1952), High Sheriff of Bedfordshire

See also
Wingfield (disambiguation)